Do You Remember Me? is a 2014 Italian romantic comedy film  directed by Rolando Ravello. It is based on a stage play with the same name. 
For his performance in this film Edoardo Leo was nominated for Nastro d'Argento for best actor.

Plot 
The troubled relationship between a primary school teacher who suffers from narcolepsy and a kleptomaniac supermarket clerk.

Cast 
 Ambra Angiolini as  Beatrice "Bea" Benassi
  Edoardo Leo as  Roberto Marino
  Paolo Calabresi as  Francesco
  Susy Laude  as  Valeria 
 Ennio Fantastichini as  Amedeo
  Pia Engleberth as  Dr. Grimaldi

See also   
 List of Italian films of 2014

References

External links 

2014 films
2014 romantic comedy films
Italian romantic comedy films
Films shot in Abruzzo
2010s Italian films